Entergy New Orleans, formerly New Orleans Public Service Incorporated (NOPSI), is an electric and natural gas utility and former mass transit provider that was based in New Orleans, Louisiana.

The various streetcar lines of New Orleans were consolidated under NOPSI's control in 1922.  Throughout the 1950s and 1960s, NOPSI converted all the original streetcar lines in New Orleans, except for the St. Charles Streetcar Line, to bus service.

It was headquartered in a building built in 1929, which later became the NOPSI New Orleans hotel.

In 1983, control of the system's mass transit was transferred to a public agency, the New Orleans Regional Transit Authority.  NOPSI became Entergy New Orleans, a subsidiary of Entergy, in April 1996.

Facilities

 New Orleans Power Station

References

External links

Companies based in New Orleans
Transportation in New Orleans
Bus transportation in Louisiana
Passenger rail transportation in Louisiana
Electric power companies of the United States
Natural gas companies of the United States
Entergy